Celebration is an album by drummer Andrew Cyrille. It was recorded in February and May 1975 at Ali's Alley Studio 77 in New York City, and was released later that year by the Institute of Percussive Studies. On the album, Cyrille is joined by members of the band Māōnō: saxophonist David S. Ware, trumpeter Ted Daniel, vocalist Jeanne Lee, synthesizer player Romulus Franceschini, pianist Donald Smith, bassist Stafford James, and percussionist Alphonse Cimber. The musicians are joined by poet Elouise Loftin.

Reception

In a review for The Rolling Stone Jazz Record Guide, Ashley Kahn stated that the album "produced an improvised collage that swung in its experimental mayhem, spliced with revolutionary lyrics."

Track listing
"Gossip" composed by Jimmy Lyons. Remaining tracks by Andrew Cyrille.

 "Haitian Heritage (Pt. 1): Voices Of The Lineage" – 12:01
 "Haitian Heritage (Pt. 1): Agowé, Hūntō (Spirit In The Drum)" – 2:46
 "Haitian Heritage (Pt. 2): Levitation" – 12:15
 "Fate" – 9:32
 "Gossip" – 7:25
 "Non-Expectation Celebration" – 9:25

Personnel 
 Andrew Cyrille – drums, percussion
 David S. Ware – tenor saxophone
 Ted Daniel – trumpet
 Jeanne Lee – vocals
 Romulus Franceschini – synthesizer
 Donald Smith – piano
 Stafford James – bass
 Alphonse Cimber – percussion
 Elouise Loftin – performer (poet)

References

1975 albums
Andrew Cyrille albums